James Skiles McCullough (May 4, 1843 – June 22, 1914) was an American politician.

Born in Mercersburg, Pennsylvania, McCullough moved with his family to Urbana, Illinois. McCullough went to the Fulton public schools. He served in the 76th Illinois Volunteer Infantry Regiment during the American Civil War. After the civil war McCullough went to the soldiers school in Fulton, Illinois. He then moved back to Urbana, Illinois and served as deputy clerk for Champaign County, Illinois. McCullough was elected county clerk for Champaign County and was a Republican. From 1897 to 1913, McCullough served as the Auditor of Public Accounts, the State of Illinois. McCullough died at his home in Champaign, Illinois after suffering a stroke.

Notes

1843 births
1914 deaths
People from Mercersburg, Pennsylvania
People from Urbana, Illinois
People of Illinois in the American Civil War
Illinois Republicans
County clerks in Illinois
Auditors of Public Accounts of Illinois
People from Champaign, Illinois